Combustion and Flame is a monthly peer-reviewed scientific journal published  by Elsevier on behalf of the Combustion Institute. It covers fundamental research on combustion science. The editors-in-chief are Fokion Egolfopoulos (University of Southern California) and Thierry Poinsot (Centre National de la Recherche Scientifique).

Abstracting and indexing
The journal is abstracted and indexed in:

According to the Journal Citation Reports, the journal has a 2020 impact factor of 4.185, ranking it 9th out of 60 in the category of Thermodynamics.

See also

References

External links
 

Elsevier academic journals
Chemistry journals
Physics journals
Engineering journals
Publications established in 1957
English-language journals
Combustion
Monthly journals